Straight Talk is a 1992 American romantic comedy film directed by Barnet Kellman and starring Dolly Parton, Jerry Orbach, Griffin Dunne  and James Woods.

Plot

Shirlee Kenyon is a dance instructor living in Arkansas. Fired for giving advice to her clients rather than teaching them dance, she attempts to convince her boyfriend (Michael Madsen) to move to Chicago with her. After he declines and belittles her, she decides to move there without him.

Once she arrives, she stands on a bridge enjoying the view of the city when she accidentally drops a twenty dollar bill. As she climbs over the rail to retrieve the money, Jack (James Woods), an investigative journalist, sees her from his office window and assumes she is trying to commit suicide. He runs out to rescue her, but as he attempts to grab and "save" her, Shirlee almost falls into the river and loses the 20 she had been trying to recover. Afterwards, she tells him about the 20. Jack tries to give her money, saying she must need it more than him if she is willing to risk her life to retrieve it. She refuses and they part.

Shirlee stops into a cafe for breakfast, and chats with another customer, Janice (Teri Hatcher), annoyed at having been stood up by her boyfriend the previous evening. Shirlee tells her he is taking her for granted, and advises her to end the relationship, only to realize that Janice's boyfriend is, in fact, Jack. When he shows up, Janice breaks it off. He thanks Shirlee for "wrecking his entire day", as he leaves.

After several job interviews, a manager at a local radio station (Paula Newsome) hires her as a switchboard operator, despite her lack of experience. On her first day, she inadvertently walks into a studio, and is mistaken for the station's new call in therapist. She is put on the air, and begins hesitantly talking with the show's callers. Upon completion of the show, the program director arrives, and fires Shirlee, along with the producer and engineer, who had put her on the air.

However, Shirlee's radio segment becomes in high demand with their audience, prompting the radio station boss, Mr. Perlman, to make Shirlee the new radio personality. Alan finds Shirlee and convinces her to do the show, offering an $800 per week contract. Shirlee accepts the position, but there is one condition: she must pretend to be a real clinical doctor.

She reluctantly accepts and becomes a popular radio figure as "Doctor Shirlee." Jack suspects something when he realizes the woman who was ready to risk her life for twenty dollars is a 'doctor'. Although his editor disagrees, Jack pursues the story. He begins to date Shirlee, initially in an attempt to get closer to uncover her story, but he soon falls for her. Her boyfriend from Arkansas arrives in Chicago to try to get her back, though his attempts fall short, and Shirlee and Jack make love.

As Jack has true feelings for her, he refuses to publish the story, resigning. However, Shirlee receives another visit from her ex, who tells her he remembered having previously met Jack in Arkansas, and that he was asking a number of questions about her. Shirlee realizes Jack is a reporter, and his interest may be purely to uncover her story. Storming off, she refuses to take his calls.

As Shirlee's popularity increases, a mishap involving some of her previous advice to a caller eventually causes her to confess the truth to everyone on air that she is not a real doctor, and she then leaves the show. Her listeners call in, wanting her back, regardless of her credentials. Someone calls in, suggesting everyone listening to honk their horns at midnight if they want Shirlee back. Jack tracks Shirlee down on the same bridge where they had first met and convinces her to take him back.

When she hears the horns, Jack tells her that they are for her. She eventually goes back to the radio show, but insists that she just wants to be called "Shirlee."

Cast
 Dolly Parton as Shirlee Kenyon
 James Woods as Jack Russell
 Griffin Dunne as Alan Riegert
 Michael Madsen as Steve
 Philip Bosco as Gene Perlman
 Jerry Orbach as Milo Jacoby
 Deirdre O'Connell as Lily
 John Sayles as Guy Girardi
 Teri Hatcher as Janice
 Spalding Gray as Dr. David Erdman
 Amy Morton as Ann
 Charles Fleischer as Tony
 Keith MacKechnie as Gordon
 Jay Thomas as "Zim" Zimmerman
 Paula Newsome as Ellen
 Tracy Letts as Sean
 John Gegenhuber as The Waiter
 Paul Dinello as Casey

Production
The vast majority of the film was shot in historic downtown Lemont, Illinois. The "Flank Center" building was used to house the dance sequence scenes in the beginning of the film. Both Dolly Parton and James Woods ate at local establishments during filming off times.

Most filming occurred in the early hours of the morning with the usage of high intensity floodlights to depict daytime. This was done to reduce interference with the general public who crowded the streets throughout the weeks of filming. The bar in the raining scene, Tom's Place, and the Barber Shop are still open with some small movie memorabilia.

Soundtrack
Parton composed ten original songs for the film soundtrack, including a re recording of her 1976 hit "Light of a Clear Blue Morning".

Reception
The film received mixed reviews, with much of the praise going to Parton and Woods's performances, while at the same time criticizing the story itself.

Box office
Straight Talk opened at the American box office at  4, grossing $4,575,746. The movie spent four weeks in the box office charts and grossed $21,202,099. The film was released in the United Kingdom on June 12, 1992, and opened at No. 1.

Home media
The film was released to VHS and laserdisc shortly after its theatrical release by Hollywood Pictures Home Video. A DVD release came from Hollywood Pictures Home Video in 2003. In 2011, Mill Creek Entertainment acquired the home video rights to the film, along with many others from Hollywood and Touchstone Pictures and released the film on DVD and Blu ray. Mill Creek's DVD of the film is available by itself, as part of a double-feature set with Big Business, and a triple feature set with Big Business and V.I. Warshawski.

References

External links
 
 
 

1992 films
Hollywood Pictures films
1992 romantic comedy films
Films set in Chicago
Films shot in Chicago
Films produced by Robert Chartoff
Films scored by Brad Fiedel
Films with screenplays by Patricia Resnick
American romantic comedy films
1990s English-language films
Films directed by Barnet Kellman
1990s American films